Susanna Minttu Maria Lehtinen (born 8 May 1983) is a retired Finnish football midfielder. She last played in the Swedish Damallsvenskan for KIF Örebro, a club she represented for eight seasons. She has also played for FC Espoo, FC Honka (Naisten Liiga) and Florida Atlantic Owls (NCAA).

She was a member of the Finnish national team from 2005 until 2014, representing her country at the UEFA Women's Euro 2009. In June 2013 Lehtinen was also selected by the national coach Andrée Jeglertz to be part of the squad at the UEFA Women's Euro 2013.

References

External links
 
 
 
 

1983 births
Living people
Finnish women's footballers
Finland women's international footballers
Finnish expatriate footballers
Expatriate women's footballers in Sweden
Finnish expatriate sportspeople in Sweden
Expatriate women's soccer players in the United States
KIF Örebro DFF players
Damallsvenskan players
Kansallinen Liiga players
FC Honka (women) players
USL W-League (1995–2015) players
Florida Atlantic Owls women's soccer players
Women's association football defenders
Women's association football midfielders
Finnish expatriate sportspeople in the United States